Elections are held in Saint-Pierre and Miquelon for the French president, a member of the National Assembly, a member of the Senate, and a territorial legislature.

Presidential elections 

Electors from Saint-Pierre and Miquelon vote in all French presidential clections.

Member of the National Assembly
Elections are held at the same time as in France. The current deputy is Annick Girardin, affiliated with the Left Radical Party in the National Assembly. She was first elected in 2007.

Member of the Senate

Senators are only elected by a small college of electors, delegates of the General Council of Saint-Pierre and Miquelon and delegates of the two Municipal Councils. The current Senator is Karine Claireaux, who until 2020 also was the Mayor of St Pierre.

General Council 

Saint-Pierre and Miquelon elects on territorial level a legislature. The General Council (Conseil Général) has 19 members, elected for a six-year term in single-seat constituencies.
Saint-Pierre and Miquelon has a multi-party system, with numerous parties.

Elections are held in two stages. The first stage (Premier tour) is open to all candidates and the majority of seats can only be given out if a political group achieves true majority at the ballot box. If no majority is attained on this ballot, a second ballot is held the following Sunday. On the second ballot (Second tour), only a relative majority is necessary to obtain 11 out of the 19 seats. The rest of the seats (save 4 for Miquelon) are distributed through a system of proportional representation.

Latest elections

Municipal elections 
Both municipalities have elected councils.

See also
 Electoral calendar
 Electoral system

External links
 Archipel demain
 Cap sur l'avenir
 Saint-Pierre & Miquelon Information
 Saint-Pierre & Miquelon Community website, includes political discussions